Aubrey Trent Gover (born June 30, 1959) is a Canadian politician. He represented the electoral district of Bonavista South in the Newfoundland and Labrador House of Assembly from 1989 to 1993. He is a member of the Liberal Party of Newfoundland and Labrador. He was born in St. John's, Newfoundland and Labrador.

References

1959 births
Living people
Progressive Conservative Party of Newfoundland and Labrador MHAs
Politicians from St. John's, Newfoundland and Labrador